Rocche del Reopasso is a mountain in Liguria, northern Italy, part of the Ligurian Apennines.

Conservation 
The mountain since 1989 is included in the Parco naturale regionale dell'Antola.

References

Mountains under 1000 metres
Mountains of Liguria
Mountains of the Apennines